Nine Lives is a 1968 science fiction novelette by Ursula K. Le Guin. Originally published in Playboy magazine (it was reprinted in The Wind's Twelve Quarters), the story uses human cloning to explore perceptions of self and other. When it was published, Le Guin opted for publishing it under her initials (U.K. Le Guin) rather than her name, as per Playboy suggestion that a female author would make its readers "nervous". Le Guin has said "It's not surprising that Playboy hadn't had its consciousness raised back then, but it is surprising to me to realize how thoughtlessly I went along with them. It was the first (and is the only) time I met with anything I understood as sexual prejudice, prejudice against me as a woman writer, from any editor or publisher; and it seemed so silly, so grotesque, that I failed to see that it was also important." 
It was first recognized on the national level when president Lyndon B. Johnson found the story in Playboy and heavily endorsed it. The presidential endorsement caused the story to spread across the country very rapidly, with an extremely positive result. It was nominated for the Nebula Award for Best Novelette in 1969.

"Nine Lives" is one of the few stories Le Guin has described as being "hard-core" science fiction, using the concept of cloning to explore the concept of the "self".  Le Guin also disclosed that the inspiration for "Nine Lives" came from a chapter in Gordon Rattray Taylor's 1968 book, The Biological Time Bomb.

In November 2012, "Nine Lives" was published in a two-part collection of short stories Le Guin released called "The Unreal and the Real". Volume one was titled "Where on Earth" and highlighted "interest in realism and magic realism and includes eighteen of Le Guin’s satirical, political, and experimental earthbound stories." Volume two, where "Nine Lives" was published, was titled "Outer Space Inner Lands" and focused more on Le Guin's non-realistic stories.

Themes

The overarching theme in "Nine Lives" is the concept of the self. Some critics believe that "Nine Lives" also explores the theme of using "technology to illustrate ethical and sociological dilemmas," in addition to examining ideas of humanity and consciousness through the themes of cloning, exploration, paranoia, and disaster. Other critics regard "Nine Lives" as being more "straight" Science Fiction, that doesn't challenge ideas of perspective or weave in messages.

References
Notes

Bibliography

1969 short stories
Novels with bisexual themes
Science fiction short stories
Short stories by Ursula K. Le Guin
LGBT speculative fiction novels